Alexander Kenneth Maclean,  (October 18, 1869  July 31, 1942) was a Canadian politician and judge.

Early life and education
Born in Upper North Sydney, Cape Breton County, Nova Scotia, Maclean was educated at Pictou Academy and Dalhousie University.

Career
A lawyer, practising in Lunenburg, Nova Scotia, Maclean first ran unsuccessfully for the House of Commons of Canada in the 1900 federal election for the electoral district of Lunenburg. In 1901, he was elected to the Nova Scotia House of Assembly for Lunenburg. A Nova Scotia Liberal, he served until 1904 when he was elected to the House of Commons representing Lunenburg.

He resigned as an MP in 1909, when he was re-elected to the House of Assembly and was appointed Attorney General and Commissioner of Crown Lands in the cabinet of George Henry Murray. He served until 1911, when he was elected again to the House of Commons for the electoral district of Halifax. As a result of the Conscription Crisis of 1917 he crossed the floor on October 10, 1917, to support the Unionist government of Sir Robert Laird Borden and was a minister without portfolio in the Cabinet. He left the government in 1920 and was re-elected as a Liberal in the 1921 general election.

He resigned his seat in 1923 to become President of the Exchequer Court of Canada, holding that position until his death. He also acted as an ad hoc judge at the Supreme Court of Canada, sitting 67 times during his career.

His most significant decision is considered to be the one he wrote in R. v. Eastern Terminal Elevator Co., which was affirmed by the Supreme Court. Maclean's decision is generally considered to be highly competent, where the issue was well thought out and analyzed, in contrast with Duff J's subsequent opinion at the SCC.

electoral results

References

Further reading

External links
 
 The Canadian Parliament; biographical sketches and photo-engravures of the senators and members of the House of Commons of Canada. Being the tenth Parliament, elected November 3, 1904

1869 births
1942 deaths
Liberal Party of Canada MPs
Liberal-Unionist MPs in Canada
Members of the House of Commons of Canada from Nova Scotia
Members of the King's Privy Council for Canada
Nova Scotia Liberal Party MLAs
Judges of the Exchequer Court of Canada